The women's 200 metre breaststroke was a swimming event held as part of the swimming at the 1928 Summer Olympics programme. It was the second appearance of the event, which was established in 1924. The competition was held from Tuesday to Thursday, 7 to 9 August 1928.

Twenty-one swimmers from twelve nations competed.

Records
These were the standing world and Olympic records (in minutes) prior to the 1928 Summer Olympics.

In the first heat Hilde Schrader set a new Olympic record with 3:11.6 minutes. In the second semi-final she equalized the standing world record with 3:11.2 minutes.

Results

Heats

Tuesday 7 August 1928: The fastest three in each heat advanced.

Heat 1

Heat 2

Heat 3

Heat 4

Semifinals

Wednesday 8 August 1928: The fastest three in each semi-final advanced.

Semifinal 1

Semifinal 2

Final

Thursday 9 August 1928:

References

External links
Olympic Report
 

Swimming at the 1928 Summer Olympics
1928 in women's swimming
Swim